Monte Pascoal is a mountain to the south of the city of Porto Seguro, in the state of Bahia, Brazil. 

According to history, it was the first part of land viewed by Portuguese explorer Pedro Álvares Cabral, allegedly the first European to arrive in Brazil, in 1500.  It was described as a tall, rounded mountain arising from the ocean. 

Monte Pascoal is a national symbol to Brazilians and gives its name to a national park, Parque Nacional do Monte Pascoal. The name "Pascoal" refers to "Páscoa" (Portuguese for "Easter"), as the sighting of the mount happened around the date of that festival.

It is one of the locations where the old growth Atlantic Forest (Mata Atlântica) remains, and has been preserved.

Notes

External links

Mountains of Brazil
Geography of Bahia